The Duke of Kent is a Grade II listed public house at 2 Scotch Common, Ealing, London.

It was built in 1929 by Nowell Parr as the "Kent Hotel"  and is owned by Fuller's Brewery.

References

Grade II listed buildings in the London Borough of Ealing
Grade II listed pubs in London
Pubs in the London Borough of Ealing
Buildings by Nowell Parr